Tommy the Toreador is a 1959 British musical comedy film directed by John Paddy Carstairs and starring Tommy Steele, Janet Munro, Sid James, Bernard Cribbins, Noel Purcell and Kenneth Williams.

Premise
A British ship docks in Spain and Tommy, a sailor from London, gets stranded after he saves the life of a bullfighter.

Cast
 Tommy Steele as Tommy
 Janet Munro as Amanda
 Sid James as Cadena
 Bernard Cribbins as Paco
 Noel Purcell as Captain
 Virgilio Teixeira as Parilla, the Bullfighter
 José Nieto as Inspector Quintero
 Ferdy Mayne as Lopez
 Harold Kasket as Jose
 Kenneth Williams as Vice-Consul
 Eric Sykes as Martin

Production
Janet Munro was borrowed from Walt Disney, who had her under contract. The film was shot at the Associated British studios in Borehamwood. There was location filming in Seville in May 1959. Steele says filming took 12 weeks and that Carstairs was a "chubby, jovial ball of energy... his direction was always precise and without fuss."

Songs
The songs were written by Lionel Bart, Mike Pratt and Steele who had collaborated on The Duke Wore Jeans. Steele said their aim on the film were to present "a score of tunes and lyrics that joined the plot without ever stopping it in its tracks."

The songs included:
"Tommy the Toreador"
"Take a Ride"
"Little White Bull"
"Singing Time"
"Where's the Birdie?" - sung with James and Cribbins
"Amanda"

Critical reception
In The Radio Times, Tom Vallance gave the film three out of five stars, and wrote, "perky pop star Tommy Steele, a former seaman himself, plays the part of a sailor in this lively and likeable musical comedy"; while 
Variety called the film "a brisk, disarming little comedy."

Box Office
Kine Weekly called it a "money maker" at the British box office in 1960.

Legacy
Steele says the song "Little White Bull" helped him form a new career because children loved the song and parents would bring them to his rock concerts to hear it.

References

Notes

External links
Tommy the Toreador at IMDb
Tommy the Toreador at Letterbox DVD
Tommy the Toreador at BFI

1959 films
1959 musical comedy films
British musical comedy films
Bullfighting films
Films directed by John Paddy Carstairs
Films shot at Associated British Studios
Films shot in the province of Seville
Films set in Spain
Films with screenplays by Patrick Kirwan
Films with screenplays by Sid Colin
1950s English-language films
1950s British films